Hans Kalan is a village near Jagraon, Punjab, India. It is 8.8 km from Chowkimann, which is near NH-95. It is 36.6 km from the main city Ludhiana and 11.1 km from Jagraon.  Kalan is Persian language word which means Big.

Culture 

The people of Hans Kalan belong to Malwa. Punjabi is the local language.

Transportation 
By Rail
Chaunkimann Railway Station 11 km from the village
Ludhiana Railway Station 39 km from the village
Local buses and tempos

References

Cities and towns in Ludhiana district